Right to Change (also written Right2Change) is a minor political party in Ireland. It was founded in May 2020 by Joan Collins TD. Collins was elected as an Independents 4 Change TD in the 2020 general election.

A left-wing party, Collins has said that Right to Change "differs from People Before Profit in that Right to Change base their policies on the trade union movement."

References

2020 establishments in Ireland
Political parties established in 2020
Political parties in the Republic of Ireland
Left-wing politics in Ireland